The National Youth Orchestra of Canada (NYO Canada, or NYOC) is a Canadian youth orchestra headquartered in Toronto.  The orchestra has given concert tours in every major Canadian city as well as trips to other countries, including the United States, Japan, China and countries in Europe.

History
Several musicians, including Walter Susskind, then the music director of the Toronto Symphony Orchestra, and Ezra Schabas helped to found NYO Canada in 1960, for the purpose of allowing young musicians to gain experience needed to play in professional orchestras. In 1996, the delegates to the World Youth Orchestra Conference in Tokyo, who represented 39 countries, voted to award NYO Canada the “Best Youth Orchestra in the World”. More than 40% of the professional musicians in Canadian orchestras have previously played in NYO Canada.

Resident conductors of NYO Canada have included Victor Feldbrill, who served in the post from 1960 to 1964, and subsequently in 1969 and in 1975.  Georg Tintner conducted the orchestra for a number of years, ending in 1989.

In 2009, NYO Canada performed its first-ever concert which was streamed in its entirety over the internet.  In 2017, NYO Canada commissioned a large art installation titled Four Seasons of the Canadian Flag, to be displayed as part of their tour in the year of Canada's 150th birthday.  In 2018, the orchestra performed at Young Euro Classic in Berlin and at the Edinburgh International Festival.

In December 2021, NYO Canada announced the appointment of Sascha Goetzel as its next music director, for 2022 and 2023.  Goetzel had first guest-conducted NYO Canada in November 2019.

See also

 List of youth orchestras
 Ezra Schabas

References

External links
 Official web page of the National Youth Orchestra of Canada

Year of establishment missing
Canadian orchestras
Musical groups from the Regional Municipality of Waterloo
Youth organizations based in Canada
National youth orchestras
Musical groups established in 1960
1960 establishments in Canada